The 9th Washington D.C. Area Film Critics Association Awards were given out on December 6, 2010.

Winners and nominees
Best Film
 The Social Network
 127 Hours
 Black Swan
 Inception
 Toy Story 3

Best Director
 David Fincher – The Social Network
 Darren Aronofsky – Black Swan
 Danny Boyle – 127 Hours
 Joel Coen and Ethan Coen – True Grit
 Christopher Nolan – Inception

Best Actor
 Colin Firth – The King's Speech
 Jeff Bridges – True Grit
 Robert Duvall – Get Low
 Jesse Eisenberg – The Social Network
 James Franco – 127 Hours

Best Actress
 Jennifer Lawrence – Winter's Bone
 Annette Bening – The Kids Are All Right
 Anne Hathaway – Love & Other Drugs
 Nicole Kidman – Rabbit Hole
 Natalie Portman – Black Swan

Best Supporting Actor
 Christian Bale – The Fighter
 Andrew Garfield – The Social Network
 John Hawkes – Winter's Bone
 Sam Rockwell – Conviction
 Geoffrey Rush – The King's Speech

Best Supporting Actress
 Melissa Leo – The Fighter
 Amy Adams – The Fighter
 Helena Bonham Carter – The King's Speech
 Hailee Steinfeld – True Grit
 Jacki Weaver – Animal Kingdom

Best Adapted Screenplay
 The Social Network – Aaron Sorkin 127 Hours – Simon Beaufoy and Danny Boyle
 Toy Story 3 – Michael Arndt
 True Grit – Joel Coen and Ethan Coen
 Winter's Bone – Debra Granik and Anne RoselliniBest Original Screenplay Inception – Christopher Nolan Another Year – Mike Leigh
 Black Swan – Mark Heyman, Andres Heinz, and John McLaughlin
 The Kids Are All Right – Lisa Cholodenko and Stuart Blumberg
 The King's Speech – David SeidlerBest Cast The Town
 The Fighter
 Inception
 The Kids Are All Right
 The Social Network

Best Animated Film
 Toy Story 3
 Despicable Me
 How to Train Your Dragon
 Shrek Forever After
 Tangled
 Megamind
Best Documentary Film
 Exit Through the Gift Shop
 Inside Job
 Restrepo
 The Tillman Story
 Waiting for "Superman"

Best Foreign Language Film
 Biutiful • Mexico
 The Girl with the Dragon Tattoo • Sweden
 I Am Love • Italy
 Mother • South Korea
 White Material • France

Best Art Direction
 Inception
 Alice in Wonderland
 Black Swan
 Harry Potter and the Deathly Hallows – Part 1
 True Grit

Best Cinematography
 Inception
 127 Hours
 Black Swan
 The Social Network
 True Grit

Best Score
 Inception – Hans Zimmer
 127 Hours – A. R. Rahman
 Black Swan – Clint Mansell
 The Social Network – Trent Reznor and Atticus Ross
 True Grit – Carter Burwell

References

External links
 The Washington D.C. Area Film Critics Association

2010
2010 film awards